Viy is a 1909 Russian short film directed and written by Vasili Goncharov. This is the first Russian film-horror.

The film is considered lost.

Plot 
The film is a screen version of the 1835 novella by Gogol.

Cast 
 I. Langfeld
 A. Platonov
 V. Dalskaya

References

External links 
 Viy on KinoPoisk
 Viy on vseokino.ru

1909 films
1900s Russian-language films
Russian silent short films
1909 short films
Russian black-and-white films
Films directed by Vasily Goncharov
Films of the Russian Empire
Films based on Viy (story)
Lost Russian films
1909 lost films
Folk horror films
Films based on Russian folklore
Films based on Slavic mythology
Films about witchcraft
Pathé films